Rune is a role-playing game published by Atlas Games in 2001.

Description
Atlas Games contracted Robin Laws to write the Rune role-playing game, based on the computer game Rune. Laws determined that for Rune, "the game would need to have a big point of difference to distinguish it from the many other fantasy games available"; in this case, the game would allow players to swap roles with the Game Master (GM): "You can win! And when you're not the GM, it's not boring because the GM can win!"

Publication history
Rune was published by Atlas Games in 2001.

Reception

Reviews
Pyramid review

References

Atlas Games games
Fantasy role-playing games
Robin Laws games
Role-playing games based on video games
Role-playing games introduced in 2001